Henry E. "Hank" Moreno (May 12, 1930 - February 1, 2007) was a Thoroughbred horse racing jockey.

Moreno's most important win for Harry F. Guggenheim's stable came in the 1953 Kentucky Derby when he rode Dark Star to victory over future the Hall of Fame colt, Native Dancer.

Henry Moreno rode a number of stakes race winners for Cain Hoy Stable including Kentucky Oaks and Beldame Stakes winner, Lalun and the prized Garden State Stakes for juvenile horses aboard Turn-To. However, Moreno's most important win for Harry F. Guggenheim's stable came in the 1953 Kentucky Derby when he rode Dark Star to victory over future the Hall of Fame colt, Native Dancer. Of his three mounts in the Preakness Stakes, Moreno's best result was aboard The Scoundrel in 1964 when he had a second-place finish behind Northern Dancer.

In his later years he lived in Hemet, California and battled pancreatic cancer and in 2007 died at age 77 at Florence, Oregon.

References

1930 births
2007 deaths
American jockeys
People from Hemet, California